Seridó Ecological Station is a hot, semi-arid ecological station in the state of Rio Grande do Norte, Brazil.

Location

The station was created on 31 May 1982 to preserve the Caatinga ecosystem, with a semi-arid climate and vegetation typical of the north eastern interior.
It is in the Serra Negra do Norte municipality of the state of Rio Grande do Norte.
It is a federal conservation unit managed by the Chico Mendes Institute for Biodiversity Conservation.

Environment

There are relatively few mammals, which include fox, margay and armadillo. 57 species of bird have been observed.

Status

The Ecological Station is a "strict nature reserve" under IUCN protected area category Ia.
The purpose is to conserve nature and support scientific research.
Poaching is an issue, as are sporadic invasions of cattle from neighbouring farms.

References

Sources

1982 establishments in Brazil
Ecological stations of Brazil
Protected areas of Rio Grande do Norte
Protected areas established in 1982
Caatinga